Emperor Taizong of Jin (25 November 1075 – 9 February 1135), personal name Wuqimai, sinicised name Wanyan Sheng, was the second emperor of the Jurchen-led Jin dynasty of China. His era name was "Tianhui" (天會). During his reign, the Jin dynasty conquered the Khitan-led Liao dynasty. He then led the Jin in their campaigns against the Song dynasty, captured the Northern Song capital in 1127 and went on to rule most of northern China. After his death, he was posthumously honoured with the temple name Taizong by his successor, Emperor Xizong.

Life
Wuqimai was the fourth son of Helibo and his primary consort, Lady Nalan (拏懒氏). He was a younger brother of Aguda (Emperor Taizu), the founder and first emperor of the Jin dynasty. He succeeded his brother in 1123. Two years later, the Jin general Wanyan Loushi (完顏婁室) led forces to attack the Khitan-led Liao dynasty and succeeded in capturing Emperor Tianzuo, the last Liao ruler, thereby ending the Liao dynasty's existence.

In October 1125, Emperor Taizong waged war against the Han Chinese-led Song dynasty and ordered his fifth brother, Wanyan Gao (完顏杲), to lead the Jin armies to attack Bianjing (present-day Kaifeng, Henan Province), the Song capital, from two different directions. The Song general Li Gang (李綱) led fierce resistance against the Jin invaders. After some time, the Jin and Song dynasties agreed to a truce. In August 1126, Emperor Taizong ordered Wanyan Zongwang (完顏宗望) and Wanyan Zonghan to lead Jin forces to attack and besiege Bianjing again. This time, the Jin dynasty not only conquered Bianjing, but also captured Emperors Huizong and Qinzong of the Song dynasty. This event, historically known as the Jingkang Incident, marked the end of the Northern Song dynasty and beginning of the Southern Song dynasty.

In 1128, Emperor Taizong gave ironic titles of nobility to the two captured former Song emperors; Emperor Huizong was called "Duke Hunde" (昏德公; literally "Besotted Duke") while Emperor Qinzong was called "Marquis Chonghun" (重昏侯; literally "Doubly Besotted Marquis"). They were resettled in Wuguocheng (五國城; in present-day Yilan County, Heilongjiang Province).

During his reign, Emperor Taizong laid and strengthened the Jin dynasty's political system and institutions. In his later years, he designated Hela, a grandson of Aguda, as his successor. He died in Mingde Palace in 1135 and was buried in the He Mausoleum (和陵). His descendants were massacred by Digunai (Prince of Hailing), the fourth ruler of the Jin dynasty, as a political move to eliminate possible contenders to the throne. His remains were relocated to Dafangshan (大房山), which became known as the Gong Mausoleum (恭陵).

Family
Parents
 Father: Helibo
 Mother: Empress Yijian of the Nalan clan (翼簡皇后 拏懒氏)
Wives
 Empress Qinren of the Tangkuo clan (欽仁皇后 唐括氏)
 Puluhu (蒲魯虎), sinicised name Wanyan Zongpan (完顏宗磐), the Prince of Song (宋王), first son 
Unknown:
 Hulu (胡魯), sinicised name Wanyan Zonggu (完顏宗固), the Prince of Bin (豳王)
 Hulubu (斛魯補), sinicised name Wanyan Zongya (完顏宗雅), the Prince of Dai (代王)
 Aludai (阿魯帶), sinicised name Wanyan Zongshun (完顏宗順), the Prince of Xu (徐王)
 Alubu (阿魯補), sinicised name Wanyan Zongwei (完顏宗偉), the Prince of Yu (虞王)
 Hushahu (斛沙虎), sinicised name Wanyan Zongying (完顏宗英), the Prince of Teng (滕王)
 Alin (阿鄰), sinicised name Wanyan Zongyi (完顏宗懿), the Prince of Xue (薛王)
 Alu (阿魯), sinicised name Wanyan Zongben (完顏宗本), the Prince of Yuan (原王)
 Gulan (鶻懶), the Prince of Yi (翼王)
 Hulijia (胡里甲), sinicised name Wanyan Zongmei (完顏宗美), the Prince of Feng (豐王)
 Shentumen (神土門), the Prince of Yun (鄆王)
 Huboshu (斛孛束), the Prince of Huo (霍王)
 Wolie (斡烈), the Prince of Cai (蔡王)
 Gusha (鶻沙), sinicised name Wanyan Zongzhe (完顏宗哲), the Prince of Bi (畢王)

|-

1075 births
1135 deaths
Jin dynasty (1115–1234) emperors
12th-century Chinese monarchs